Ou Reang is a district (srok) located in Mondulkiri Province, in Cambodia.

References

Districts of Mondulkiri province